Charles Wesley Thomas  (born December 26, 1978) is a former left fielder in Major League Baseball. Thomas played with the Atlanta Braves, and Oakland Athletics. He batted and threw left-handed.

Amateur career
Thomas played baseball and graduated from Asheville High School in Asheville, North Carolina. He would play collegiately at Western Carolina University. In 1999, he played collegiate summer baseball with the Orleans Cardinals of the Cape Cod Baseball League. He was selected by the Braves in the 19th round of the 2000 MLB Draft.

Professional career
That season, he got a chance to play at Triple-A Richmond when Atlanta called up or released the outfielders ahead of him. Thomas took advantage of the opportunity. He went 31-for-79 (.379) in June, led the International League in hitting and on-base percentage, and was selected to the All-Star team.

Thomas started 2004 as the fourth outfielder for Richmond and made the big club in the mid-season. He posted a .288 batting average with seven home runs and 31 RBI in 83 games. He showed a great batting eye, speedy running, and outstanding defense.

At the 2004 Winter Meetings, the Braves traded Thomas and pitchers Juan Cruz and Dan Meyer to the Oakland Athletics for Tim Hudson.

In the 2005 season, he had a rough start and despite starting nearly every game went weeks without getting a hit. Eventually, Thomas was demoted to AAA, where he spent most of his remaining time in Oakland. On May 4, 2007, he was dealt to the Brewers in exchange for JD Closser. He played the rest of the 2007 season with Milwaukee's Triple-A club, the Nashville Sounds.

References

External links

1978 births
Living people
African-American baseball players
Atlanta Braves players
Baseball players from California
Greenville Braves players
Jamestown Jammers players
Macon Braves players
Major League Baseball left fielders
Myrtle Beach Pelicans players
Nashville Sounds players
Oakland Athletics players
Orleans Firebirds players
People from Fairfield, California
Richmond Braves players
Sacramento River Cats players
Tiburones de La Guaira players
American expatriate baseball players in Venezuela
Western Carolina Catamounts baseball players
21st-century African-American sportspeople
20th-century African-American sportspeople